A senatorial election was held in the Philippines on November 13, 1951. The election was known as a midterm election as the date when elected candidates take office falls halfway through President Elpidio Quirino's four-year term.

Summary
As the Hukbalahap insurgency raged in Central Luzon, Filipinos trooped to the polling booths for the 1951 midterm elections—a referendum on President Quirino, who had won the presidency in his own right two years prior. Despite the political remarriage of the two factions of the Liberal Party, the Quirinistas and Avelinistas, the Quirino administration was still far from popular and had gained notoriety for its inability to rein in corruption and its ineffectual attempts to police lawlessness in the countryside. The Nacionalistas took advantage of the situation and mounted an active campaign to wrest back the Senate from the LP. Led by former President Jose P. Laurel, Quirino’s chief adversary in the 1949 presidential polls, the NP swept all eight Senate seats in contention, the first total victory of the opposition in the Senate. So strong was the rejection of the Quirino administration in 1951 that even LP top honcho, Senate President Mariano Jesus Cuenco, lost his seat. Laurel received the highest number of votes, which was seen as his political rehabilitation and which made him the first and only president, thus far, to have served in the Senate after his presidency.

Felisberto Verano, also a Nacionalista, won the special elections held on the same day to fill the Senate seat vacated by Vice-President Fernando Lopez.

Block voting, established in 1941, was abolished in 1951 with Republic Act No. 599. This would later lead to more fragmented results in most national elections.

Retiring incumbents

Liberal Party
Melecio Arranz
Jose Avelino
Vicente J. Francisco
Ramon Torres

Mid-term vacancies
Fernando Lopez, (Liberal, took office as vice president December 30, 1949)
Vicente Sotto, (Popular Front, died July 16, 1950)
Tomas Confesor (Nacionalista, died June 5, 1951)

Results
The Nacionalista Party won all eight seats contested in the general election, and the seat contested in the special election.

Former Senate President Mariano Jesús Cuenco was the sole incumbent defeated, while Carlos P. Garcia successfully defended his seat.

Six winners are neophyte Nacionalista senators: Manuel Briones, Francisco Afan Delgado, Jose Locsin, Cipriano Primicias Sr., Gil Puyat and Jose Zulueta.

Nacionalista Jose P. Laurel returned to the Senate after serving from 1925 to 1931.

Key:
 ‡ Seats up
 + Gained by a party from another party
 √ Held by the incumbent
 * Held by the same party with a new senator
^ Vacancy

Per candidate

Per party
The seat vacated by Vicente Yap Sotto (Popular Front), who died in 1950, was one of the seats up for election. This also includes the result of the concurrent special election for the seat vacated by Vice President Fernando Lopez in 1949.

Special election

To serve the unexpired term of Fernando Lopez until December 30, 1953.

See also
Commission on Elections
Politics of the Philippines
2nd Congress of the Philippines

References

External links
 Official website of the Commission on Elections

1951
Senate election